The French destroyer Mécanicien Principal Lestin was the second of two Enseigne Roux-class destroyers built for the French Navy during the First World War.

Design and description
The Enseigne Roux class was an enlarged version of the preceding . They displaced  at normal load. Their crew numbered 76–81 men.

The ships were powered by a pair of Parsons steam turbines, each driving one propeller shaft using steam provided by four water-tube boilers.

The primary armament of the Enseigne Roux-class ships consisted of two  Modèle 1893 guns in single mounts, one each fore and aft of the superstructure, and four  Modèle 1902 guns distributed amidships. They were also fitted with two twin mounts for  torpedo tubes amidships.

Construction and career
Mécanicien Principal Lestin was ordered from the Arsenal de Rochefort and was laid down on 12 November 1913. The ship was launched on 15 May 1915 and completed the following year. She was initially assigned the Mediterraneand Fleet and was transferred to the Dunkirk Flotilla defending the English Channel in 1918.

Citations

References

 
 

1915 ships
Enseigne Roux-class destroyers
Ships built in France